Mehmet Vecdi Gönül (born 29 November 1939) is a Turkish politician who served as the Minister of National Defense from 3 July to 17 November 2015. He previously served in the same position from 2002 to 2011 and was a member of the Parliament from 1999 to 2015.

Gönül first entered Parliament following the 1999 general election for Kocaeli from the Islamist Virtue Party (FP). He joined the Justice and Development Party (AKP) in 2011 when the FP was shut down and was re-elected as an AKP MP from Kocaeli in the 2002 general election. He became minister of national defence in the government of Abdullah Gül and continued in his position when Recep Tayyip Erdoğan took over as prime minister in March 2003. He was re-elected as an MP, this time from İzmir's second electoral district, in the 2007 general election and again from Antalya in 2011. In Erdoğan's third cabinet, he was succeeded as national defense minister by İsmet Yılmaz.

Due to the AKP's three term limit, Gönül stepped down from Parliament at the June 2015 general election. After serving national defense minister İsmet Yılmaz was elected as Speaker of the Grand National Assembly on 1 July 2015, Gönül was re-appointed as national defense minister by Prime Minister Ahmet Davutoğlu despite not being an MP and served in the post until 17 November 2015.

Biography

Gönül was born in Erzincan. His father, Saffet, was a teacher in military high schools. His mother's name was Lütfiye. He graduated in political science from Ankara University in 1960 and returned to Erzincan as a civil servant. He completed a master's degree in Public Administration at the University of Southern California and then returned to a career in public administration in Turkey, eventually becoming Chief of the Directorate of General Security (October 1977 - February 1978) and then governor of Kocaeli, Ankara (during the 1980 Turkish coup d'état) and Istanbul provinces. In the mid-1980s he was governor of Izmir where he is remembered for a large project of road-building and the construction of Adnan Menderes Airport. Gönül eventually became president of the Public Spending Authority (Sayıştay), the country's highest authority on public finance.

Gönül was elected to the Turkish parliament for Kocaeli on 18 April 1999, and was part of the vanguard of the incumbent AKP. When Tayyip Erdoğan was barred from entering parliament, he became a candidate for party leadership, and later a candidate for the presidency.

He became Minister of National Defence on 19 November 2002, serving in that post until 6 July 2011.

Vecdi Gönül is married and has three children. He speaks English.

Views on the Armenian genocide and population exchange with Greece 
In 2008, Gönül stated:

These statements were widely criticized in the Turkish press as they were interpreted as justifying the Armenian genocide and other atrocities.

References

Living people
1939 births
Deputies of Kocaeli
Ministers of National Defence of Turkey
Justice and Development Party (Turkey) politicians
Turkish civil servants
Ankara University Faculty of Political Sciences alumni
People from Erzincan
USC Sol Price School of Public Policy alumni
Governors of Ankara
İzmir Province
Deputies of Izmir
Deputies of Antalya
Members of the 24th Parliament of Turkey
Members of the 23rd Parliament of Turkey
Members of the 22nd Parliament of Turkey
Members of the 21st Parliament of Turkey
Members of the 63rd government of Turkey
Members of the 60th government of Turkey
Deputy Speakers of the Grand National Assembly of Turkey